Bayleaf is an unincorporated community in Bartons Creek Township, Wake County, North Carolina, United States. It has an elevation of 427 ft. The center of the community lies at the intersection of Six Forks Rd (SR 1005), Norwood Rd (SR 1834), Possum Track Rd (SR 2002), Bayleaf Church Rd (SR 2003), and Honeycutt Rd (SR 2005).

The community is home to a fire station, Bay Leaf Baptist Church, and St. Luke the Evangelist Catholic Church.

History 
A one room schoolhouse was built in the community in the late 1870s.  It was called "Bay Leaf", a name which sounded like "Bailey", a common family name in the area, but also was named after the numerous bay trees that grew around a nearby spring.

In 1880, Bay Leaf Missionary Baptist Church was founded.  J. R. Maynard was the first pastor.  The church building was completed in 1889.

References 

Unincorporated communities in Wake County, North Carolina
Unincorporated communities in North Carolina